Gēmusetto (stylized as ゲームセット) is an American adult animated series created by Max Simonet, that premiered on April 1, 2019 on Adult Swim. The first season, titled Gēmusetto Machu Picchu (stylized as ゲ–ムセット Machu Picchu), follows the exploits of Makasu, a sportsman and relic thief, who constantly challenges the gods of several different religions for their relics, and his companion Back Pocket Dimension Flying Bear, on their quest to gain the treasures of the Inca-gods all the while he is chased by Bendy Rivers, a member of Interpol tasked with stopping Makasu.

The first season parodies anime-style shows, intentionally using rather strange and amateurish animation, constantly shifting quality in drawing-style, as well as rather off-beat and crass humor. The program also features several other segments in between "episodes" and parts such as alternate openings for each part, educational material regarding the different Inca-gods, flashback-segments of past challenges Makasu has faced, and fake toy-commercials promoting the program.

The series was renewed for a 14-episode second season, titled Gēmusetto: Death Beat(s) (stylized as ゲームセッ2 death beat(s)), which premiered on November 8, 2020 on Adult Swim's Toonami programming block. The second season was first revealed on April 1, 2020, as a brief clip of the season premiere was shown before leading into the night's April Fools prank. This season has a more conventional 11-minute runtime per episode as part of the Toonami block.

Broadcast and release
All six episodes of the first season were aired over the course of six hours on the early morning of April 1, 2019 as part of Adult Swim's annual April Fools prank. The series' existence had only been discussed on Adult Swim's live streaming programs (mainly Bloodfeast, where the original shorts had debuted) and had not received any kind of official announcement prior to the debut. Adult Swim added each episode to their website the following day, and soon after to their YouTube channel in the form of a four-hour-and-fourteen-minute movie. The network has reran the first season since, albeit split up into 11 half-hour episodes.

The series' debut was also simulcast on the Canadian cable network Action, which was already scheduled to become an Adult Swim-branded channel later that morning at 6:00 a.m.

The second season was initially announced on April 1, 2020, with the cold open and intro to episode 1 airing as the start of Adult Swim's April Fools prank. The intro, however, would be interrupted by Post Malone, leading into the actual prank for the night, three-and-a-half hours of sneak peeks. A press release confirmed the second season's existence, with a release date set for the fall. Creator Max Simonet originally confirmed a September 25, 2020 release date on the Adult Swim Podcast. However, the series was delayed to November 7, 2020 at 2 a.m. ET/PT (effectively November 8), airing as part of Adult Swim's Toonami programming block. Following a sudden schedule change on December 19, 2020 (effectively December 20) to air Wonder Woman: Bloodlines and Justice League: The New Frontier, the final four episodes of the season were pushed off the Toonami block and aired the next day, though these four episodes would later rerun on Toonami in January 2021.

Episodes

Series overview

Season 1: Gēmusetto Machu Picchu (2019)

Season 2: Gēmusetto: Death Beat(s) (2020)

See also

List of adult animated television series
List of animated television series of 2019
List of programs broadcast by Adult Swim
Perfect Hair Forever, another anime parody series produced by Williams Street

References

Notes

External links

2010s American adult animated television series
2010s American parody television series
2019 American television series debuts
2020 American television series endings
2020s American adult animated television series
2020s American parody television series
Adult Swim original programming
American adult animated comedy television series
American adult animated television spin-offs
American flash adult animated television series
American television series with live action and animation
Anime-influenced Western animated television series
English-language television shows
Television series by Williams Street